Badimia is a genus of foliicolous (leaf-inhabiting) lichens in the family Ramalinaceae.

Taxonomy
Badimia was circumscribed by Czech lichenologist Antonin Vězda in 1986 as a segregate of the genus Bacidia, and originally contained six species. The genus was formerly placed in the family Ectolechiaceae or the Pilocarpaceae, but molecular analysis showed that the type species Badimia dimidiata nested within the Ramalinaceae. This familial placement has been accepted in recent large-scale updates of fungal classifications.

Species
Badimia cateilea (Vain.) Lücking, Lumbsch & Elix (1994)
Badimia corticola Kalb & Vězda (1987)
Badimia dimidiata (Bab. ex Leight.) Vězda (1986)
Badimia elegans (Vain.) Vězda (1986)
Badimia elixii Kalb & Lumbsch (2001)
Badimia galbinea (Kremp.) Vězda (1986)
Badimia lecanorina (Zahlbr.) Lücking, Lumbsch & Elix (1994)
Badimia leioplacella (Müll.Arg.) Lücking (2008)
Badimia lucida Aptroot & Sérus. (1997)
Badimia montoyana Lücking (1995)
Badimia multiseptata Papong & Lücking (2011)
Badimia pallidula (Kremp.) Vězda (1986)
Badimia polillensis (Vain.) Vězda (1986)
Badimia stanhopeae (Müll.Arg.) Vězda (1989)
Badimia subelegans Sipman & Lücking (1998)
Badimia tuckermanii (R.Sant.) Lücking, Lumbsch & Elix (1994)
Badimia verrucosa (Vězda) Lücking & Vězda (2008)
Badimia vezdana Lücking, Farkas & V. Wirth (2011)
Badimia vieillardii (Müll.Arg.) Vězda (1986)

References

Lecanorales genera
Lichen genera
Pilocarpaceae
Taxa named by Antonín Vězda
Taxa described in 1986